Daniel Parantac (born November 4, 1990) is a Filipino wushu practitioner. He has represented the Philippines in various wushu international competitions and won several medals. He was named Athlete of the Year at the 2013 Kafagway Sports Achievers Awards. He studied at the University of the Cordilleras for his higher education.

References

External links
Daniel Parantac -2014 Asian Games Athlete Profile 

1990 births
Living people
Filipino wushu practitioners
Wushu practitioners at the 2010 Asian Games
Wushu practitioners at the 2014 Asian Games
People from Baguio
Asian Games medalists in wushu
Asian Games silver medalists for the Philippines
Medalists at the 2014 Asian Games
Southeast Asian Games gold medalists for the Philippines
Southeast Asian Games silver medalists for the Philippines
Southeast Asian Games medalists in wushu
Wushu practitioners at the 2018 Asian Games
Competitors at the 2011 Southeast Asian Games
Competitors at the 2013 Southeast Asian Games
Competitors at the 2015 Southeast Asian Games
Competitors at the 2017 Southeast Asian Games
Competitors at the 2019 Southeast Asian Games
University of the Cordilleras alumni
Tai chi practitioners